Anatoly Evgenevich Lokot (born 18 January 1959, Novosibirsk) is the mayor of Novosibirsk, in Russia.

In 1981, he graduated from the Department of Physics and Technics of the Novosibirsk State Technical University.

He is a member of the Communist Party of the Russian Federation, and was previously a member of the State Duma.

He was elected in April 2014 with around 44% of the vote. He unexpectedly narrowly defeated the United Russia candidate by uniting the bulk of opposition forces.

During the September 2019 elections, Anatoly was re-elected as mayor with over 50% of the vote.

References

External links 
Communist Party Deputy Elected Mayor of Novosibirsk
Putin's party loses mayor race in Russia's third largest city
Seven interesting facts about the Life of Anatoly Lokot. Novosibirskiye Novosti. Семь интересных фактов из жизни Анатолия Локтя. Новосибирские новости. 

Living people
Mayors of Novosibirsk
Communist Party of the Russian Federation members
1959 births
Russian atheists
Fourth convocation members of the State Duma (Russian Federation)
Fifth convocation members of the State Duma (Russian Federation)
Sixth convocation members of the State Duma (Russian Federation)
Novosibirsk State Technical University alumni